Mahal Ahdas-e Sad Rudbal (also Romanized as Maḩal Āḩdās̄-e Sad Rūdbāl) is a village in PolShekesteh, in the Central District of Darab County, Fars Province, Iran. At the 2006 census, its population was 271, in 14 families.

References 

Populated places in Estahban County